Bordj Badji Mokhtar Airport  is an airport  northwest of Bordj Badji Mokhtar, Algeria.

Airlines and destinations
The only airline currently operating regular flights to/from the airport is Air Algérie.

See also

Transport in Algeria
List of airports in Algeria

References

External links 
 SkyVector - Bordj Mokhtar Airport
 
 
 

Airports in Algeria
Buildings and structures in Adrar Province